Geoffrey Lower (born March 19, 1963) is an American former actor known for playing Reverend Timothy Johnson on Dr. Quinn, Medicine Woman. He also played Monica Geller's boyfriend Alan in the Friends episode "The One With the Thumb".

Early life and education
Lower grew up in Casper, Wyoming. He attended the University of Nebraska–Lincoln and Juilliard School.

Career
Lower's contemporary theater credits include What Doesn't Kill Us at the McCadden Theatre in Hollywood, California, There's One in Every Marriage at P.R.T.E. and The Marrieds at the Whitmore-Lindley Theatre Center. In addition to six seasons as the Rev. Timothy Johnson on the CBS-TV series Dr. Quinn, Medicine Woman, Lower's television career includes two seasons on The Trials of Rosie O'Neill (1990), as well as many guest appearances on numerous other TV series, with one notable appearance on NBC's Quantum Leap as Confederate officer Lieutenant Montgomery in the Season 5 episode "The Leap Between The States". His film appearances have placed him alongside a wide array of award-winning acting colleagues, which include Frances McDormand, John Lithgow, Robin Williams, Peter Gallagher, and Giancarlo Giannini.

He has appeared on HGTV's House Hunters Renovation program, in Silver Lake, California, where Lower works as a general contractor and carpenter. On this episode, he was assisting in the homeowner's renovation of their new, Spanish-style bungalow.

He appeared in a stage production of The Graduate at the Laguna Playhouse as Mr. Robinson, opposite Melanie Griffith as Mrs. Robinson.

Personal life
Lower lives in Los Angeles with his wife, producer Karen Severin.

Filmography

Film

Television

References

External links

1963 births
20th-century American male actors
American male television actors
People from Casper, Wyoming
Living people
University of Nebraska alumni
Juilliard School alumni
21st-century American male actors
American male film actors